The Ritual dance of the royal drum is a drumming tradition from Burundi that combines synchronised drumming with dancing and traditional songs. In 2014, it was added to the  Representative List of the Intangible Cultural Heritage of Humanity by UNESCO.

The dance usually has about a dozen drums, in a semicircle around a central drum. A few of the drummers also dance to the rhythm. In ancient Burundi, drums were sacred objects, reserved only for people performing rituals. The major events of the country were marked by their beating, like coronations and royal funerals.

In 2017, a Presidential decree said that only male performers were to be allowed to play the drums in the future.

Gallery

See also
 Royal Drummers of Burundi

References

External links
 

Intangible Cultural Heritage of Humanity
Drumming